Hasan Mohsin (born 11 January 1998) is a Pakistani cricketer. He made his List A debut for Sindh in the 2017 Pakistan Cup on 18 April 2017. Prior to his List A debut, he was named in Pakistan's squad for the 2016 Under-19 Cricket World Cup. He made his first-class debut for Pakistan Television in the 2017–18 Quaid-e-Azam Trophy on 3 October 2017. He made his Twenty20 debut for Multan in the 2018–19 National T20 Cup on 11 December 2018.

In September 2019, he was named in Sindh's squad for the 2019–20 Quaid-e-Azam Trophy tournament. In November 2019, he was named in Pakistan's squad for the 2019 ACC Emerging Teams Asia Cup in Bangladesh.

References

External links
 

1998 births
Living people
Pakistani cricketers
Cricketers from Karachi
Sindh cricketers
Karachi Kings cricketers
Multan cricketers
Pakistan Television cricketers